The  Monument to the heroes of the October Revolution and the Civil War is a memorial in Ufa, Bashkortostan, Russia. It was opened in 1975.

References

Monuments and memorials in Ufa
Statues in Russia
Sculptures in the Soviet Union
Outdoor sculptures in Russia
War monuments and memorials
1975 establishments in Russia
Cultural heritage monuments of regional significance in Bashkortostan